The depiction of Jesus in pictorial form dates back to early Christian art and architecture, as aniconism in Christianity was rejected within the ante-Nicene period. It took several centuries to reach a conventional standardized form for his physical appearance, which has subsequently remained largely stable since that time. Most images of Jesus have in common a number of traits which are now almost universally associated with Jesus, although variants are seen.

The conventional image of a fully bearded Jesus with long hair emerged around AD 300, but did not become established until the 6th century in Eastern Christianity, and much later in the West. It has always had the advantage of being easily recognizable, and distinguishing Jesus from other figures shown around him, which the use of a cruciform halo also achieves.  Earlier images were much more varied.

Images of Jesus tend to show ethnic characteristics similar to those of the culture in which the image has been created. Beliefs that certain images are historically authentic, or have acquired an authoritative status from Church tradition, remain powerful among some of the faithful, in Eastern Orthodoxy, Anglicanism, and Roman Catholicism. The Shroud of Turin is now the best-known example, though the Image of Edessa and the Veil of Veronica were better known in medieval times.

The representation of Jesus was controversial in the early period; the regional Synod of Elvira in Spain in 306 states in its 36th canon that no images should be in churches. Later, in the Eastern church, Byzantine iconoclasm banned and destroyed images of Christ for a period, before they returned in full strength. In the 16th-century Protestant Reformation, the followers of John Calvin in particular saw images of Christ as idolatrous and enforced their removal. Due to their understanding of the second of the Ten Commandments, most Evangelical Protestants still avoid displaying representations of Jesus in their places of worship.

Early Christianity

Before Constantine 

Except for Jesus wearing tzitzit—the tassels on a tallit—in Matthew 14:36 and Luke 8:43–44, there is no physical description of Jesus contained in any of the canonical Gospels.  In the Acts of the Apostles, Jesus is said to have manifested as a "light from heaven" that temporarily blinded the Apostle Paul, but no specific form is given. In the Book of Revelation there is a vision the author had of "someone like a Son of Man" in spirit form: "dressed in a robe reaching down to his feet and with a golden sash around his chest. The hair on his head were white like wool, and his eyes were like blazing fire. His feet were like burnt bronze glowing in a furnace (...) His face was like the sun shining in all its brilliance" (Revelation 1:12–16, NIV). Use in art of the Revelation description of Jesus has generally been restricted to illustrations of the book itself, and nothing in the scripture confirms the spiritual form's resemblance to the physical form Jesus took in his life on Earth.

Exodus 20:4–6 "Thou shalt not make unto thee any graven image" is one of the Ten Commandments and made Jewish depictions of first-century individuals a scarcity. But attitudes towards the interpretation of this Commandment changed through the centuries, in that while first-century rabbis in Judea objected violently to the depiction of human figures and placement of statues in Temples, third-century Babylonian Jews had different views; and while no figural art from first-century Roman Judea exists, the art on the Dura synagogue walls developed with no objection from the Rabbis early in the third century.

During the persecution of Christians under the Roman Empire, Christian art was necessarily furtive and ambiguous, and there was hostility to idols in a group still with a large component of members with Jewish origins, surrounded by, and polemicising against, sophisticated pagan images of gods. Irenaeus (d. c. 202), Clement of Alexandria (d. 215), Lactantius (c. 240–c. 320) and Eusebius of Caesarea (d. c. 339) disapproved of portrayals in images of Jesus.  The 36th canon of the non-ecumenical Synod of Elvira in 306 AD reads, "It has been decreed that no pictures be had in the churches, and that which is worshipped or adored be not painted on the walls", which has been interpreted by John Calvin and other Protestants as an interdiction of the making of images of Christ. The issue remained the subject of controversy until the end of the 4th century.

The earliest surviving Christian art comes from the late 2nd to early 4th centuries on the walls of tombs belonging, most likely, to wealthy Christians in the catacombs of Rome, although from literary evidence there may well have been panel icons which, like almost all classical painting, have disappeared.

Initially Jesus was represented indirectly by pictogram symbols such as the ichthys (fish), the peacock, or an anchor (the Labarum or Chi-Rho was a later development). The staurogram seems to have been a very early representation of the crucified Jesus within the sacred texts. Later personified symbols were used, including Jonah, whose three days in the belly of the whale pre-figured the interval between Christ's death and resurrection; Daniel in the lion's den; or Orpheus charming the animals. The image of "The Good Shepherd", a beardless youth in pastoral scenes collecting sheep, was the most common of these images, and was probably not understood as a portrait of the historical Jesus at this period. It continues the classical Kriophoros ("ram-bearer" figure), and in some cases may also represent the Shepherd of Hermas, a popular Christian literary work of the 2nd century.

Among the earliest depictions clearly intended to directly represent Jesus himself are many showing him as a baby, usually held by his mother, especially in the Adoration of the Magi, seen as the first theophany, or display of the incarnate Christ to the world at large. The oldest known portrait of Jesus, found in Syria and dated to about 235, shows him as a beardless young man of authoritative and dignified bearing. He is depicted dressed in the style of a young philosopher, with close-cropped hair and wearing a tunic and pallium—signs of good breeding in Greco-Roman society. From this, it is evident that some early Christians paid no heed to the historical context of Jesus being a Jew and visualised him solely in terms of their own social context, as a quasi-heroic figure, without supernatural attributes such as a halo.

The appearance of Jesus had some theological implications. While some Christians thought Jesus should have the beautiful appearance of a young classical hero, and the Gnostics tended to think he could change his appearance at will, for which they cited the Meeting at Emmaus as evidence, others including the Church Fathers Justin (d. 165) and Tertullian (d. 220) believed, following Isaiah:53:2, that Christ's appearance was unremarkable: "he had no form nor comeliness, that we should look upon him, nor beauty that we should delight in him." But when the pagan Celsus ridiculed the Christian religion for having an ugly God in about 180, Origen (d. 248) cited Psalm 45:3: "Gird thy sword upon thy thigh, mighty one, with thy beauty and fairness" Later the emphasis of leading Christian thinkers changed; Jerome (d. 420) and Augustine of Hippo (d. 430) argued that Jesus must have been ideally beautiful in face and body. For Augustine he was "beautiful as a child, beautiful on earth, beautiful in heaven."

From the 3rd century onwards, the first narrative scenes from the Life of Christ to be clearly seen are the Baptism of Christ, painted in a catacomb in about 200, and the miracle of the Raising of Lazarus, both of which can be clearly identified by the inclusion of the dove of the Holy Spirit in Baptisms, and the vertical, shroud-wrapped body of Lazarus.  Other scenes remain ambiguous—an agape feast may be intended as a Last Supper, but before the development of a recognised physical appearance for Christ, and attributes such as the halo, it is impossible to tell, as tituli or captions are rarely used.  There are some surviving scenes from Christ's Works of about 235 from the Dura Europos church on the Persian frontier of the Empire.  During the 4th century a much greater number of scenes came to be depicted, usually showing Christ as youthful, beardless and with short hair that does not reach his shoulders, although there is considerable variation.

Jesus is sometimes shown performing miracles by means of a wand, as on the doors of Santa Sabina in Rome (430–32).  He uses the wand to change water to wine, multiply the bread and fishes, and raise Lazarus. When pictured healing, he only lays on hands. The wand is thought to be a symbol of power. The bare-faced youth with the wand may indicate that Jesus was thought of as a user of magic or wonder worker by some of the early Christians.<ref> The Two Faces of Jesus by Robin M. Jensen, Bible Review, 17.8, Oct 2002</ref> No art has been found picturing Jesus with a wand before the 2nd century. Some scholars suggest that the Gospel of Mark, the Secret Gospel of Mark and the Gospel of John (the so-called Signs Gospel), portray such a wonder worker, user of magic, a magician or a Divine man. Only the Apostle Peter is also depicted in ancient art with a wand.

Another depiction, seen from the late 3rd century or early 4th century onwards, showed Jesus with a beard, and within a few decades can be very close to the conventional type that later emerged. This depiction has been said to draw variously on Imperial imagery, the type of the classical philosopher, and that of Zeus, leader of the Greek gods, or Jupiter, his Roman equivalent, and the protector of Rome. According to art historian Paul Zanker, the bearded type has long hair from the start, and a relatively long beard (contrasting with the short "classical" beard and hair always given to St Peter, and most other apostles); this depiction is specifically associated with "Charismatic" philosophers like Euphrates the Stoic, Dio of Prusa and Apollonius of Tyana, some of whom were claimed to perform miracles.

After the very earliest examples of c. 300, this depiction is mostly used for hieratic images of Jesus, and scenes from his life are more likely to use a beardless, youthful type.  The tendency of older scholars such as Talbot Rice to see the beardless Jesus as associated with a "classical" artistic style and the bearded one as representing an "Eastern" one drawing from ancient Syria, Mesopotamia and Persia seems impossible to sustain, and does not feature in more recent analyses.  Equally attempts to relate on a consistent basis the explanation for the type chosen in a particular work to the differing theological views of the time have been unsuccessful.  From the 3rd century on, some Christian leaders, such as Clement of Alexandria had recommended the wearing of beards by Christian men. The centre parting was also seen from early on, and was also associated with long-haired philosophers.

 After Constantine 
From the middle of the 4th century, after Christianity was legalized by the Edict of Milan in 313, and gained Imperial favour, there was a new range of images of Christ the King, using either of the two physical types described above, but adopting the costume and often the poses of Imperial iconography.  These developed into the various forms of Christ in Majesty.  Some scholars reject the connection between the political events and developments in iconography, seeing the change as a purely theological one, resulting from the shift of the concept and title of Pantocrator ("Ruler of all") from God the Father (still not portrayed in art) to Christ, which was a development of the same period, perhaps led by Athanasius of Alexandria (d. 373).

Another depiction drew from classical images of philosophers, often shown as a youthful "intellectual wunderkind" in Roman sarcophagii; the Traditio Legis image initially uses this type.  Gradually Jesus became shown as older, and during the 5th century the image with a beard and long hair, now with a cruciform halo, came to dominate, especially in the Eastern Empire.  In the earliest large New Testament mosaic cycle, in Sant'Apollinare Nuovo, Ravenna (c. 520), Jesus is beardless though the period of his ministry until the scenes of the Passion, after which he is shown with a beard.

The Good Shepherd, now clearly identified as Christ, with halo and often rich robes, is still depicted, as on the apse mosaic in the church of Santi Cosma e Damiano in Rome, where the twelve apostles are depicted as twelve sheep below the imperial Jesus, or in the Mausoleum of Galla Placidia at Ravenna.

Once the bearded, long-haired Jesus became the conventional representation of Jesus, his facial features slowly began to be standardised, although this process took until at least the 6th century in the Eastern Church, and much longer in the West, where clean-shaven Jesuses are common until the 12th century, despite the influence of Byzantine art.  But by the late Middle Ages the beard became almost universal and when Michelangelo showed a clean-shaven Apollo-like Christ in his Last Judgment fresco in the Sistine Chapel (1534–41) he came under persistent attack in the Counter-Reformation climate of Rome for this, as well as other things.

French scholar Paul Vignon has listed fifteen similarities ("marks", like tilaka) between most of the icons of Jesus after this point, particularly in the icons of "Christ Pantocrator" ("The all-powerful Messiah"). He claims that these are due to the availability of the Image of Edessa (which he claims to be identical to the Shroud of Turin, via Constantinople) to the artists.  Certainly images believed to have miraculous origins, or the Hodegetria, believed to be a portrait of Mary from the life by Saint Luke, were widely regarded as authoritative by the Early Medieval period and greatly influenced depictions.  In Eastern Orthodoxy the form of images was, and largely is, regarded as revealed truth, with a status almost equal to scripture, and the aim of artists is to copy earlier images without originality, although the style and content of images does in fact change slightly over time.

As to the historical appearance of Jesus, in one possible translation of the apostle Paul's First Epistle to the Corinthians, Paul urges Christian men of first-century Corinth not to have long hair. An early commentary by Pelagius (c. AD 354 – c. AD 420/440) says, "Paul was complaining because men were fussing about their hair and women were flaunting their locks in church. Not only was this dishonoring to them, but it was also an incitement to fornication." Some have speculated that Paul was a Nazirite who kept his hair long even though such speculation is at odds with Paul's statement in I Corinthians 11:14 that long hair for men was shameful at the time.  Jesus was a practicing Jew so presumably had a beard.

 Later periods 
By the 5th century depictions of the Passion began to appear, perhaps reflecting a change in the theological focus of the early Church. The 6th-century Rabbula Gospels includes some of the earliest surviving images of the crucifixion and resurrection. By the 6th century the bearded depiction of Jesus had become standard in the East, though the West, especially in northern Europe, continued to mix bearded and unbearded depictions for several centuries. The depiction with a longish face, long straight brown hair parted in the middle, and almond shaped eyes shows consistency from the 6th century to the present. Various legends developed which were believed to authenticate the historical accuracy of the standard depiction, such as the image of Edessa and later the Veil of Veronica.

Partly to aid recognition of the scenes, narrative depictions of the Life of Christ focused increasingly on the events celebrated in the major feasts of the church calendar, and the events of the Passion, neglecting the miracles and other events of Jesus' public ministry, except for the raising of Lazarus, where the mummy-like wrapped body was shown standing upright, giving an unmistakable visual signature. A cruciform halo was worn only by Jesus (and the other persons of the Trinity), while plain halos distinguished Mary, the Apostles and other saints, helping the viewer to read increasingly populated scenes.

The period of Byzantine Iconoclasm acted as a barrier to developments in the East, but by the 9th century art was permitted again. The Transfiguration of Jesus was a major theme in the East and every Eastern Orthodox monk who had trained in icon painting had to prove his craft by painting an icon of the Transfiguration. However, while Western depictions increasingly aimed at realism, in Eastern icons a low regard for perspective and alterations in the size and proportion of an image aim to reach beyond earthly reality to a spiritual meaning.

The 13th century witnessed a turning point in the portrayal of the powerful Kyrios image of Jesus as a wonder worker in the West, as the Franciscans began to emphasize the humility of Jesus both at his birth and his death via the nativity scene as well as the crucifixion.The tradition of Catholic prayer by Christian Raab, Harry Hagan, St. Meinrad Archabbey 2007  pp. 86–87 The Franciscans approached both ends of this spectrum of emotions and as the joys of the Nativity of were added to the agony of crucifixion a whole new range of emotions were ushered in, with wide-ranging cultural impact on the image of Jesus for centuries thereafter.Philippines by Lily Rose R. Tope, Detch P. Nonan-Mercado 2005  p. 109

After Giotto, Fra Angelico and others systematically developed uncluttered images that focused on the depiction of Jesus with an ideal human beauty, in works like Leonardo da Vinci's Last Supper, arguably the first High Renaissance painting.Leonardo da Vinci, the Last Supper: a Cosmic Drama and an Act of Redemption by Michael Ladwein 2006 pp. 27, 60 Images of Jesus now drew on classical sculpture, at least in some of their poses. However Michelangelo was considered to have gone much too far in his beardless Christ in his The Last Judgment fresco in the Sistine Chapel, which very clearly adapted classical sculptures of Apollo, and this path was rarely followed by other artists.

The High Renaissance was contemporary with the start of the Protestant Reformation which, especially in its first decades, violently objected to almost all public religious images as idolatrous, and vast numbers were destroyed.  Gradually images of Jesus became acceptable to most Protestants in various contexts, especially in narrative contexts, as book illustrations and prints, and later in larger paintings.  Protestant art continued the now-standard depiction of the physical appearance of Jesus.  Meanwhile, the Catholic Counter-Reformation re-affirmed the importance of art in assisting the devotions of the faithful, and encouraged the production of new images of or including Jesus in enormous numbers, also continuing to use the standard depiction.

During the 17th century, some writers, such as Thomas Browne in his Pseudodoxia Epidemica criticized depictions of Jesus with long hair. Although some scholars believed that Jesus wore long hair because he was a Nazarite and therefore could not cut his hair, Browne argues "that our Saviour was a Nazarite after this kind, we have no reason to determine; for he drank Wine, and was therefore called by the Pharisees, a Wine-bibber; he approached also the dead, as when he raised from death Lazarus, and the daughter of Jairus.” 

By the end of the 19th century, new reports of miraculous images of Jesus had appeared and continue to receive significant attention, e.g. Secondo Pia's 1898 photograph of the Shroud of Turin, one of the most controversial artifacts in history, which during its May 2010 exposition it was visited by over 2 million people.William Meacham, The Authentication of the Turin Shroud:An Issue in Archaeological Epistemology, Current Anthropology, Volume 24, No 3, June 1983 Another 20th-century depiction of Jesus, namely the Divine Mercy image based on Faustina Kowalska's reported vision has over 100 million followers.Am With You Always by Benedict Groeschel 2010  p. 548 The first cinematic portrayal of Jesus was in the 1897 film La Passion du Christ produced in Paris, which lasted 5 minutes.Encyclopedia of early cinema by Richard Abe 2005  p. 518 Thereafter cinematic portrayals have continued to show Jesus with a beard in the standard western depiction that resembles traditional images.

A scene from the documentary film Super Size Me showed American children being unable to identify a common depiction of Jesus, despite recognizing other figures like George Washington and Ronald McDonald.

 Conventional depictions 
Conventional depictions of Christ developed in medieval art include the narrative scenes of the Life of Christ, and many other conventional depictions:

Common narrative scenes from the Life of Christ in art include:
 Nativity of Jesus in art
 Adoration of the Shepherds
 Adoration of the Magi
 Finding in the Temple
 Baptism of Jesus
 Crucifixion of Jesus
 Descent from the Cross
 Last Judgement
Devotional images include:
 Madonna and child
 Christ in Majesty
 Christ Pantokrator
 Sacred Heart
 Pietà (mother and dead son)
 Lamb of God
 Man of sorrows
 Pensive Christ

 Range of depictions 

Certain local traditions have maintained different depictions, sometimes reflecting local racial characteristics, as do the Catholic and Orthodox depictions. The Coptic Church of Egypt separated in the 5th century, and has a distinctive depiction of Jesus, consistent with Coptic art.  The Ethiopian Church, also Coptic, developed on Coptic traditions, but shows Jesus and all Biblical figures with the Ethiopian appearance of its members.  Other traditions in Asia and elsewhere also show the race of Jesus as that of the local population (see Chinese picture in the gallery below).  

In modern times such variation has become more common, but images following the traditional depiction in both physical appearance and clothing are still dominant, perhaps surprisingly so. In Europe, local ethnic tendencies in depictions of Jesus can be seen, for example in Spanish, German, or Early Netherlandish painting, but almost always surrounding figures are still more strongly characterised.  For example, the Virgin Mary, after the vision reported by Bridget of Sweden, was often shown with blonde hair, but Christ's is very rarely paler than a light brown.

Some medieval Western depictions, usually of the Meeting at Emmaus, where his disciples do not recognise him at first (Luke.24.13–32), showed Jesus wearing a Jewish hat.

In 2001, the television series Son of God used one of three first-century Jewish skulls from a leading department of forensic science in Israel to depict Jesus in a new way. A face was constructed using forensic anthropology by Richard Neave, a retired medical artist from the Unit of Art in Medicine at the University of Manchester. The face that Neave constructed suggested that Jesus would have had a broad face and large nose, and differed significantly from the traditional depictions of Jesus in renaissance art. Additional information about Jesus' skin color and hair was provided by Mark Goodacre, a New Testament scholar and professor at Duke University.

Using third-century images from a synagogue—the earliest pictures of Jewish people—Goodacre proposed that Jesus' skin color would have been darker and swarthier than his traditional Western image. He also suggested that he would have had short, curly hair and a short cropped beard. Although entirely speculative as the face of Jesus, the result of the study determined that Jesus' skin would have been more olive-colored than white or black, and that he would have looked like a typical Galilean Semite. Among the points made was that the Bible records that Jesus's disciple Judas had to point him out to those arresting him in Gethsemane. The implied argument is that if Jesus's physical appearance had differed markedly from his disciples, then he would have been relatively easy to identify.

 Miraculous images of Jesus 

There are, however, some images which have been claimed to realistically show how Jesus looked. One early tradition, recorded by Eusebius of Caesarea, says that Jesus once washed his face with water and then dried it with a cloth, leaving an image of his face imprinted on the cloth. This was sent by him to King Abgarus of Edessa, who had sent a messenger asking Jesus to come and heal him of his disease.  This image, called the Mandylion or Image of Edessa, appears in history in around 525. Numerous replicas of this "image not made by human hands" remain in circulation. There are also icon compositions of Jesus and Mary that are traditionally believed by many Orthodox to have originated in paintings by Luke the Evangelist.

A currently familiar depiction is that on the Shroud of Turin, whose records go back to 1353. Controversy surrounds the shroud and its exact origin remains subject to debate. The Shroud of Turin is respected by Christians of several traditions, including Baptists, Catholics, Lutherans, Methodists, Orthodox, Pentecostals, and Presbyterians. It is one of the Catholic devotions approved by the Holy See, that to the Holy Face of Jesus, now uses the image of the face on the shroud as it appeared in the negative of the photograph taken by amateur photographer Secondo Pia in 1898.Ann Ball, 2003 Encyclopedia of Catholic Devotions and Practices  pp. 239, 635 The image cannot be clearly seen on the shroud itself with the naked eye, and it surprised Pia to the extent that he said he almost dropped and broke the photographic plate when he first saw the developed negative image on it in the evening of 28 May 1898.

Before 1898, devotion to the Holy Face of Jesus used an image based on the Veil of Veronica, where legend recounts that Veronica from Jerusalem encountered Jesus along the Via Dolorosa on the way to Calvary. When she paused to wipe the sweat from Jesus's face with her veil, the image was imprinted on the cloth. The establishment of these images as Catholic devotions traces back to Sister Marie of St Peter and the Venerable Leo Dupont who started and promoted them from 1844 to 1874 in Tours France, and Sister Maria Pierina De Micheli who associated the image from the Shroud of Turin with the devotion in 1936 in Milan Italy.

A very popular 20th-century depiction among Roman Catholics and Anglicans is the Divine Mercy image, which was approved by Pope John Paul II in April 2000. The Divine Mercy depiction is formally used in celebrations of Divine Mercy Sunday and is venerated by over 100 million Catholics who follow the devotion. The image is not part of Acheiropoieta in that it has been depicted by modern artists, but the pattern of the image is said to have been miraculously shown to Saint Faustina Kowalska in a vision of Jesus in 1931 in Płock, Poland. 

Faustina wrote in her diary that Jesus appeared to her and asked her to "Paint an image according to the pattern you see". Faustina eventually found an artist (Eugene Kazimierowski) to depict the Divine Mercy image of Jesus with his right hand raised in a sign of blessing and the left hand touching the garment near his breast, with two large rays, one red, the other white emanating from near his heart.Catherine M. Odell, 1998, Faustina: Apostle of Divine Mercy OSV Press   pp. 63–64 After Faustina's death, a number of other artists painted the image, with the depiction by Adolf Hyla being among the most reproduced.

Warner Sallman stated that The Head of Christ was the result of a "miraculous vision that he received late one night", proclaiming that "the answer came at 2 A.M., January 1924" as "a vision in response to my prayer to God in a despairing situation." The Head of Christ is venerated in the Coptic Orthodox Church, after twelve-year-old Isaac Ayoub, who diagnosed with cancer, saw the eyes of Jesus in the painting shedding tears; Fr. Ishaq Soliman of St. Mark's Coptic Church in Houston, on the same day, "testified to the miracles" and on the next day, "Dr. Atef Rizkalla, the family physician, examined the youth and certified that there were no traces of leukemia". 

With episcopal approval from Bishop Tadros of Port Said and Bishop Yuhanna of Cairo, "Sallman's Head of Christ was exhibited in the Coptic Church", with "more than fifty thousand people" visiting the church to see it. In addition, several religious magazines have explained the "power of Sallman's picture" by documenting occurrences such as headhunters letting go of a businessman and fleeing after seeing the image, a "thief who aborted his misdeed when he saw the Head of Christ on a living room wall", and deathbed conversions of non-believers to Christianity. As an extraordinarily successful work of Christian popular devotional art, it had been reproduced over half a billion times worldwide by the end of the 20th century.

 Examples 

 Sculpture 

 See also 
 :Category:Cultural depictions of Jesus
 Crucifixion
 God the Father in Western art
 Holy card
 Ichthys
 List of statues of Jesus
 Perceptions of religious imagery in natural phenomena
 Race and appearance of Jesus
 Resurrection of Jesus in Christian art
 Salvator Mundi
 Veil of Veronica
 Passion Play
 Christ figure

 Notes 

 References 
 Cartlidge, David R., and Elliott, J.K.. Art and the Christian Apocrypha, Routledge, 2001, Google books
 Every, George; Christian Mythology, Hamlyn 1988 (1970 1st edn.) 
 Grabar, André; Christian iconography: a study of its origins, Taylor & Francis, 1968,  Google books
 Grigg, Robert, "Byzantine Credulity as an Impediment to Antiquarianism", Gesta, Vol. 26, No. 1 (1987), pp. 3–9, The University of Chicago Press on behalf of the International Center of Medieval Art, JSTOR
 James Hall, A History of Ideas and Images in Italian Art, 1983, John Murray, London, 
 Hellemo, Geir. Adventus Domini: eschatological thought in 4th-century apses and catecheses. Brill; 1989. .
 G Schiller, Iconography of Christian Art, Vol. I, 1971 (English trans from German), Lund Humphries, London, 
 Eduard Syndicus; Early Christian Art; Burns & Oates, London, 1962 
 David Talbot Rice, Byzantine Art, 3rd edn 1968, Penguin Books Ltd 
 Zanker, Paul. :de:Paul Zanker. The Mask of Socrates, The Image of the Intellectual in Antiquity'', University of California Press, 1995 Online Scholarship editions

External links 

 Pictures of Jesus Perhaps Derived from the Shroud of Turin  December 2005
 Warner Sallman's Head of Christ: An American Icon
 Is this the real face of Jesus Christ?
 Images of Christ – the Deesis Mosaic of Hagia Sophia

 
Christian iconography
Early Christian art
Iconography of Jesus
Articles containing video clips
Cultural depictions of Jesus